List of published works by or about American hard science fiction author Ben Bova (1932–2020).

Novels 
 
 Escape! (1969)
 THX 1138 (with George Lucas) (1971), based on the film THX 1138
As on a Darkling Plain (1972)
 When the Sky Burned (1972)
 Gremlins, Go Home! (with Gordon Dickson) (1974)
 The Starcrossed (1975)
 The Multiple Man (1976)
 City of Darkness (1976)
 Test of Fire (1982) (A revised version of When the Sky Burned)
 The Winds of Altair (1973) (Revised 1983)
 Peacekeepers (1988)
 Cyberbooks (1989)
 The Trikon Deception (with Bill Pogue) (1992)
 Triumph (1993),  (alternate-history work, set at the end of World War II, in which Winston Churchill plots the assassination of Joseph Stalin, and in which Franklin D. Roosevelt lives past 1945)
 Death Dream (1994)
  – expanded edition later republished as The Immortality Factor
 The Green Trap (2006)
 Laugh Lines (2008) (A collection of short stories, 'The Starcrossed' and 'Cyberbooks')
  – earlier shorter edition published as Brothers
 The Hittite (2010) (A retelling of the Iliad, linking Homer's text with known history of the Hittite Empire )
 Able One (2010)
  – a "parallel" version of the exploration of Mars, where private enterprise (and not a government program) drives the conquest.
 Transhuman (2014)
 Rescue Mode (with Les Johnson) (2014)
 Space Station Down (with Doug Beason) (2020)

Exiles series
 Exiled from Earth (1971)
 Flight of Exiles (1972)
 End of Exile (1975)

Grand Tour series

Bova's Grand Tour series of novels presents a fictional treatment of human colonization of the Solar System in the late 21st century. Following Bova's suggested chronology, these are:

Bova also published a short story collection including stories that span much of the timeline, called Tales of the Grand Tour (2004)

Sam Gunn series  
 Sam Gunn, Unlimited (1993) (short-story collection)
 Sam Gunn Forever (1998) (short-story collection)
 Sam Gunn Omnibus (2007)
 Sam Gunn, Jr (2022) (posthumous)

Chet Kinsman series
 The Weathermakers (1967)
 Millennium (1976)
 Colony (1978)
 Kinsman (1979)
 The Kinsman Saga (1987) (combines Millennium (1976) and Kinsman (1979); includes introduction and narrative by Bova explaining the reworking of these two novels)

Jake Ross series
 Power Play (2011)
 Power Surge (2015)
 Power Failure (2018)
 Power Challenges (2021)

Orion series
 Orion (1984)
 Vengeance of Orion (1988)
 Orion in the Dying Time (1990)
 Orion and the Conqueror (1994)
 Orion Among the Stars (1995)
 Orion and King Arthur (2011)

To Save the Sun series
 To Save the Sun (with A.J. Austin) (1992)
 To Fear the Light (with A.J. Austin) (1994)

Voyagers series
  Voyagers (1981, volume I)
 The Alien Within (1986, volume II)
 Star Brothers (1990, volume III)
 The Return (2009, volume IV)

Watchmen series
 The Star Conquerors (1959)
 Star Watchman (1964)
 The Dueling Machine (1969)

Star Quest series
 New Earth (2013)
 Death Wave (2015)
 Apes and Angels (2016)
 Survival (2017)

Short fiction 
Collections
 Forward in Time (1973)
 Maxwell's Demons (1979)
 E (1984)
 The Astral Mirror (1985)
 Prometheans (1986)
 Battle Station (1987)
 Future Crime (1990)
 Challenges (1994)
 Twice Seven (1998)
 New Frontiers (2014)
 Best of Bova: Volume 1 (2016)
 Best of Bova: Volume 2 (2016)
 Best of Bova: Volume 3 (2017)
 My Favorites (2020)
 Anthologies (edited)
 The Many Worlds of Science Fiction (1971), 
 The Science Fiction Hall of Fame, Volume Two, (1973), Volume two A  and Volume two B 
 
 The Best of the Nebulas (1989), 
 The Future Quartet: Earth in the Year 2042 (1995)
 Nebula Awards Showcase 2008 (2008)
 

 Stories

Non-fiction

 Man Changes the Weather. 1973.

 Starflight and Other Improbabilities. Westminster Press. 1973. 
 Notes to a Science Fiction Writer. Houghton Mifflin. 1975. 
 The High Road Houghton Mifflin. 1981. 
 Assured Survival: Putting The Star Wars Defense In Perspective. 1984. UG743.B68
 Welcome to Moonbase. Ballantine. 1987.

 The Craft of Writing Science Fiction That Sells. Writers Digest Books. 1994. 
 Immortality. 1998.
 Are We Alone in the Cosmos?. 1999.
 The Story of Light. 2001.
 
 Faint Echoes, Distant Stars: The Science and Politics of Finding Life Beyond Earth. 2004.

Critical studies and reviews of Bova's work
Carbide tipped pens

References

Bibliographies by writer
Bibliographies of American writers
Science fiction bibliographies
Works by Ben Bova